Carlos is a city in Douglas County, Minnesota, United States. The population was 497 at the 2020 census.

History
Carlos was incorporated in 1904. Carlos Township, which predates the city, was named after Lake Carlos.

Geography

Minnesota State Highway 29 and County Highway 13 are two of the main routes in the community.

Demographics

2010 census
As of the census of 2010, there were 502 people, 198 households, and 137 families residing in the city. The racial makeup of the city was 99.0% White, 0.8% African American, and 0.2% from two or more races. Hispanic or Latino of any race were 0.4% of the population.

There were 198 households, of which 41.4% had children under the age of 18 living with them, 49.0% were married couples living together, 12.1% had a female householder with no husband present, 8.1% had a male householder with no wife present, and 30.8% were non-families. 25.8% of all households were made up of individuals, and 9.1% had someone living alone who was 65 years of age or older. The average household size was 2.53 and the average family size was 3.00.

The median age in the city was 32.3 years. 28.3% of residents were under the age of 18; 8.9% were between the ages of 18 and 24; 32.4% were from 25 to 44; 20.6% were from 45 to 64; and 10.2% were 65 years of age or older. The gender makeup of the city was 51.2% male and 48.8% female.

2000 census
As of the census of 2000, there were 329 people, 140 households, and 89 families residing in the city. The racial makeup of the city was 99.09% White, 0.61% African American and 0.30% Asian.

There were 140 households, out of which 29.3% had children under the age of 18 living with them, 53.6% were married couples living together, 7.9% had a female householder with no husband present, and 36.4% were non-families. 29.3% of all households were made up of individuals, and 13.6% had someone living alone who was 65 years of age or older.  The average household size was 2.32 and the average family size was 2.88.

In the city, the population was spread out, with 22.2% under the age of 18, 12.5% from 18 to 24, 26.7% from 25 to 44, 21.6% from 45 to 64, and 17.0% who were 65 years of age or older.  The median age was 37 years. For every 100 females, there were 109.6 males.  For every 100 females age 18 and over, there were 101.6 males.

The median income for a household in the city was $38,125, and the median income for a family was $44,250. Males had a median income of $22,283 versus $19,250 for females. The per capita income for the city was $21,495.  None of the families and 4.4% of the population were living below the poverty line, including no under eighteens and 5.3% of those over 64.

See also

References

External links

Cities in Minnesota
Cities in Douglas County, Minnesota